East Railway Station (East Square) is a metro station on Line 6 and Line 19 of the Hangzhou Metro in China. It is located in the Shangcheng District. It opened on November 6, 2021.

See also 
Hangzhou East railway station (for China Railway, Hangzhou Metro Line 1 and Line 4)

References 

Hangzhou Metro stations
Railway stations in China opened in 2021
Railway stations in Zhejiang